Glenn Durland Paige (28 June 1929 – 22 January 2017) was an American political scientist. He was Professor Emeritus of political science at the University of Hawaiʻi and Chair of the Governing Council of the Center for Global Nonkilling. Paige is known for developing the concept of nonkilling, his studies on political leadership, and the study of international politics from the decision-making perspective with a case study of President Harry S. Truman's decision to involve the United States in the Korean War.

Biography
The son of a YMCA social worker, Glenn Durland Paige was born on June 28, 1929 in Brockton, Massachusetts, in the northeastern part of the United States known as New England. He grew up in Rochester, New Hampshire, with summers in Provincetown, Cape Cod, Massachusetts.

He served in the U.S. Army (1948–52) as recruit, private, corporal, sergeant, second lieutenant (OCS), first lieutenant and later captain (Army Reserve, 1956–60). A Korean War veteran (1950–52), he served as communications officer at the 10th Anti-Aircraft Artillery Group, attached to the First Republic of Korea Infantry Division, September–December 1950. 

He graduated from Phillips Exeter Academy (1947), Princeton University (A.B., Politics, 1955; International Politics; Chinese and Russian languages), Harvard University (A.M., East Asian regional studies, 1957; Korean Studies, Chinese, Japanese and Korean languages) and Northwestern University (PhD political science, 1959; interdisciplinary behavioral science curriculum). After teaching at Seoul National University's Graduate School of Public Administration (1959–61), and Princeton University (1961–67), he taught at the University of Hawaiʻi (1967–92). There he introduced new courses and seminars on political leadership (1967–92) and nonviolent political alternatives (1978–92), besides lecturing introduction to political science and world politics. He helped to found the University of Hawai‘i Center for Korean Studies in 1972, the Spark M. Matsunaga Institute for Peace and its Center for Global Nonviolence Planning Project (later to become the Center for Global Nonkilling).

The journey from soldier to scholar to founder with others of the Center for Global Nonkilling can be told in terms of three discoveries.

The first began with a case study with interviews of how President Harry S Truman and other leaders engaged the United States in the Korean War in which Paige had served during 1950–52. This became a doctoral dissertation published as a book entitled The Korean Decision: June 24–30, 1950 (see also Study of the Korean War Decision-Making)

Subsequent comparative study of divided Korea’s divergent development since 1945 led to discovery of the creative potential of political leadership for social change and a call to make this a special field for research, teaching, and service in the academic discipline of political science. This was published in The Scientific Study of Political Leadership (New York: The Free Press, 1977). This "discovery" of the importance of creative political leadership for global problem-solving contributed to thinking that led to creation of the United Nations University/International Leadership Academy at the University of Jordan in 1995 through the pioneering efforts of Prime Minister Dr. Abdelsalam al-Majali under the leadership of King Hussein who announced its establishment in New York during the UN's 50th Anniversary ceremonies. Glenn D. Paige served as participant-observer and evaluator of the First UNU/ILA Leadership Programme in Jordan, Israel, Palestine, and Egypt in 1997.

The second discovery was of nonkilling as a basic value for political science and life. Glenn D. Paige's awakening to nonkilling occurred during 1973–74 and has led to more than a quarter century of discovery and re-education resulting in the thesis of Nonkilling Global Political Science. This unexpected shift by a conventionally trained, violence-accepting political scientist, whose doctoral dissertation justified war and threat of war in Korea, perhaps can be attributed in part to a process of "cognitive dissonance" in which one's values and perceptions of reality come in conflict. Having participated in and justified a Cold War crusade for freedom and peace in Korea (values) combined with opposition in 1973 by the United States and ROK governments to a University of Hawai‘i initiative to invite North Korean scholars to visit Honolulu for a peaceful cultural exchange (non-peace reality) one day produced a strongly felt value shift expressed in three words of an inner voice, "No more killing!" (see photograph above). Consequently, this value shift led both to heightened perceptions of lethal realities and to search for realistic nonkilling alternatives.

As a result, he produced a critical book review by him of his book on the Korean War, which essentially had been a scientific apologia for war. This was published as "On Values and Science: The Korean Decision Reconsidered" in American Political Science Review. Such an author review was unprecedented in the history of the APSR since 1906.

The third discovery followed projection of the logic of nonviolent critical analysis applied to his own scientific work to critique the violence-accepting assumptions of the discipline of political science as a whole. After 28 years of research, teaching, and travel to discover foundations for a new nonkilling discipline the results were published in 2002 as Nonkilling Global Political Science In 2007 it led to convening the First Global Nonkilling Leadership Forum in Honolulu, Hawai‘i, November 1–4, 2007, and by 2014 the book had been translated into 30 languages.

Social and scientific contributions

Nonkilling
Nonkilling refers to the absence of killing, threats to kill, and conditions conducive to killing in human society. Even though the use of the term in the academic world refers mostly to the killing of human beings, it is sometimes extended to include the killing of animals and other forms of life. This is also the case for the traditional use of the term "nonkilling" (or "non-killing") as part of Buddhist ethics, as expressed in the first precept of the Pancasila, and in similar terms throughout world spiritual traditions. Significantly, "nonkilling" has also been used recently in the "Charter for a World without Violence" approved by the 8th World Summit of Nobel Peace Laureates.

In analysis of its causes, nonkilling encompasses the concepts of peace (absence of war and conditions conducive to war), nonviolence (psychological, physical, and structural), and ahimsa (noninjury in thought, word and deed). Not excluding any of the latter, nonkilling provides a distinct approach characterized by the measurability of its goals and the open-ended nature of its realization. While the usage of terms such as "nonviolence" and "peace" often follow the classical form of argument through abstract ideas leading to passivity, killing (and its opposite, nonkilling), it can be quantified and related to specific causes by following a clinical perspective (prevention, intervention and post-traumatic transformation toward the progressive eradication of killing). Glenn D. Paige's contributions, namely the volume Nonkilling Global Political Science but also many of his articles dating back from the 80s, significantly developed the usage of this term among the academic world. Currently, the Center for Global Nonkilling hosts a series of Nonkilling Research Committees bringing together over 700 scholars from more than 300 universities.

In 2021 an annual "International Nonkilling Day" was begun on June 28th, Dr. Page's birthday. The first global colloquium was virtual, and titled: “Creating an Affirmative Nonkilling World”.

The Scientific Study of Political Leadership
Paige’s 1977 The Scientific Study of Political Leadership has been considered, jointly with James MacGregor Burns’ 1978 Leadership, a landmark for the foundation and institutionalization of political leadership as discipline, following Harold Lasswell's challenge to study this field as a subject for multidisciplinary research grounded in social science theory. In this essay, Paige presents a conceptual framework through which the study of political leadership, and leadership in general, can be organized and developed following scientific bases. This framework, presented as an "multivariate, multidimensional linkage approach" considers six main factors that impact the behavior of political leaders: personality, role, organization, tasks, values, and setting. At the same time, these factors also generate patterns of behavior that can affect or be affected by 18 societal political dimensions as the extent of conflict, the use of violence, the presence of consensus, and the practice of compromise.

Study of the Korean War decision making
In his 1968 book The Korean Decision: June 24–30, 1950, Paige provided a significant contribution to the scientific study of international politics by exploring in a first case study the decision-making approach to analysis pioneered by Richard C. Snyder, opening new lines of inquiry. The volume presents a reconstruction of the United States government's decision to intervene in Korea in 1950, through the careful documentation of the seven days of crucial decision-making that led to the country's involvement in the war. Besides reviewing key documentation and examining the circumstances surrounding the intervention from 1945 to 1950, major players in this process, including U.S. President Harry S. Truman, Secretary of State Dean G. Acheson, Secretary of Defense Louis A. Johnson, Secretary of the Air Force Thomas K. Finletter, Secretary of the Army Frank Pace and Assistant Secretary of State for Far Eastern Affairs Dean Rusk, among others, were extensively interviewed.

Beside reconstructing decisions from the point of view of the decision makers, Paige analyzes them in terms of the interaction of organizational, informational, and motivational variables; evaluating and providing guidance for coping with future war-prone crisis situation. With important points in common with the decision-centered conception of the policy sciences laid out by Harold D. Lasswell and Myres S. McDougal, Paige brings forward the importance of decision-making itself. The observational standpoint, conceptions of the decision process, definition of decisional situations, crisis as a special occasion for decision, linkages among variables, and appraisal as a particular decision process function made the work unique, having been used a reference model not only in academia but also among government and the military.

Ten years after the publication of this work, Paige prepared a critical book review of his book on the Korean War, which essentially had been a scientific apologia for war. This was published as “On Values and Science: The Korean Decision Reconsidered” in the American Political Science Review. Such an author review was unprecedented in the history of the APSR since 1906.

Academic achievements, awards and honors

Honors and awards
Army Commendation Medal, 1952
Woodrow Wilson National Fellowship, 1955–56
Kent Fellow, Society for Religion and Higher Education, 1955–57
Ford Foundation Foreign Area Training Fellow, 1956–59
Princeton University John Witherspoon Bicentennial Preceptorship, 1962–65
Seikyo Culture Price (Japan), 1982
Ramachandran Award for International Understanding (India), 1986
Anuvrat Award for International Peace (India), 1987
Princeton University Class of 1955 Award, 1987
Third Gandhi Memorial Lecturer (India), 1990
Distinguished Life Fellow, Delhi School of Nonviolence (India), 1992
Honorary PhD, Soka University (Japan), 1992
Magisterium International Council (Russia), 1994
Jai Tulsi Anuvrat Award (India), 1995
Orden de Mérito Guillermo Gaviria Correa (Colombia), 2004
Festschrift in Korean: Pisalsaeng chongch’ihak gwa chigu p’yonghwa undong. Glenn D. Paige kyosu ui hakmun segye [Nonkilling Political Science and the Global Peace Movement. The Scholarly World of Professor Glenn D. Paige] (Seoul: Jipmoondang, 2004)
Distinguished Career Award, American Political Science Association, 2004
Lifetime Peacemaker Award, 2005
Peace Day Hawai‘i Award, 2008
Distinguished Peace Leadership Award, 2010
Jamnalal Bajaj International Award for Promoting Gandhian Values Outside India, 2012
Honorary Doctorate of Humanities from Jagran Lakecity University in Bhopal, India, 2016

Visiting appointments
Assistant Professor, Columbia University, 1962.
Visiting Researcher, Asiatic Research Center, Korea University, Seoul, 1965.
Senior Specialist, Institute for Advanced Projects, East-West Center, Honolulu, 1964.
Visiting Researcher, Gandhigram Rural Institute (Deemed University), Madurai District, Tamil Nadu, India, 1976 and 1977.
Visiting Researcher, Institute for Peace Science, Hiroshima University, Japan, 1978.
Senior Scholar, Australian-American Educational Commission, Australia, 1980.
Visiting Scholar, Institute of Oriental Studies, USSR Academy of Sciences, Moscow, 1982.
Visiting Scholar, Chinese Academy of Social Sciences, Beijing, June 24 – July 6, 1982
Visiting Scholar, Swedish Association for Adult Education, Stockholm, 1984.
Research Associate, Peace Research Institute, Soka University, Tokyo, 1985.
Visiting Scholar, Korean Association of Social Scientists, 1987 and 1990.

Professional affiliations
American Political Science Association
International Political Science Association
International Peace Research Association
World Futures Studies Federation

Select bibliography

 "Report on an international exploratory seminar on Islam and nonviolence, held in Bali, Indonesia, during February 14–19, 1986. Indonesian translation: Islam tanpa Kekerasan, Yogyakarta: LkiS, 1st edition, August 1998; 2nd edition, September 2000. "
 "Korean translation: 비폭력과 한국정치 [Bipokryeok gwa Hanguk jeongchi, Nonviolence and Korean Politics], Seoul: Jipmoondang, 1999. "

See also
Center for Global Nonkilling
Nonkilling Science
Nonkilling studies

References

External links
Center for Global Nonkilling
School of Nonkilling Studies at Wikiversity
"Glenn Paige's Room" at Anis Online
Charter for a World without Violence
Center for Global Nonkilling Channel on YouTube

1929 births
2017 deaths
American pacifists
American political scientists
People from Brockton, Massachusetts
People from Hawaii
University of Hawaiʻi faculty
Harvard University alumni
Princeton University alumni
Northwestern University alumni
Nonviolence advocates